Bertalan Lányi (born as Bertalan Jakobi 21 March 1851 – 15 February 1921) was a Hungarian politician and jurist, who served as Minister of Justice between 1905 and 1906.

References

External links
 
 Magyar Életrajzi Lexikon

1851 births
1921 deaths
Justice ministers of Hungary